Ludovico Fossali (born 21 May 1997) is an Italian speed climber. He competed at the 2020 Summer Olympics, in Men's combined sport climbing.

Career 
Fossali won several medals at the Italian Climbing Championships, including the speed climbing gold medal at the 2017 championships in Arco.

He won the overall bronze speed climbing medal in the 2017 IFSC Climbing World Cup.

He won the speed climbing gold medal at the 2019 IFSC Climbing World Championships in Hachioji, Japan. He placed 9th in the Combined event, securing a qualification for the Tokyo 2020 Olympics.

References

External links
 
 
 
 
 

1997 births
Italian mountain climbers
Living people
Italian rock climbers
Competitors at the 2017 World Games
Sport climbers at the 2020 Summer Olympics
Olympic sport climbers of Italy
21st-century Italian people
IFSC Climbing World Championships medalists
IFSC Climbing World Cup overall medalists
Speed climbers